Fahy is a surname derived from the Irish surname Ó Fathaigh.  Alternative spellings include Fahie, Fahey and Fay.

People named Fahy include:
 Anthony Dominic Fahy, (1805–1871), Irish Dominican priest and missionary
 Charles Fahy (1892–1979), Solicitor General of the United States
 Edward Francis Fahy (1922–2005), Irish physicist and administrator
 Francis Arthur Fahy (1854–1935), Irish nationalist, songwriter and poet
 Francis Patrick Fahy (1880–1953), Irish teacher, barrister, and Fianna Fáil politician
 Greg Fahy, cryobiologist and biogerontologist
 Jack Fahy, U.S. government official
 Jim Fahy (born 1946), Irish broadcaster, journalist and documentary-maker
 John Fahy, Scottish football player 
 Meghann Fahy (born 1990), American actress and singer
 Michael Fahy, Irish farmer and politician
 Ollie Fahy (born 1975), Irish hurler 
 Pádraic Fahy (born 1948), Irish sportsperson
 Patricia Fahy, American politician 
 Sir Peter Fahy (born 1959), British police officer
 Shea Fahy (born 1962), Gaelic football player

Anglicised Irish-language surnames